East Devon is a constituency represented in the House of Commons of the UK Parliament since 2019 by Simon Jupp of the Conservative Party.

A report by the Electoral Reform Society found the seat (and its precursors) has been held by the Conservative Party since 1835, meaning it has been held for 186 years. This is currently the longest held seat by one party anywhere in the country.

Boundaries 

1868–1885: The Hundreds of Axminster, Cliston, Colyton, East Budleigh, Exminster, Ottery St. Mary, Haytor, and Teignbridge, and Exeter Castle, and the parts of the hundred of Wonford that are not included in the city of Exeter.

1997–2010: The District of East Devon wards of Axminster Hamlets, Axminster Town, Beer, Budleigh Salterton, Colyton, Edenvale, Exmouth Brixington, Exmouth Halsdon, Exmouth Littleham Rural, Exmouth Littleham Urban, Exmouth Withycombe Raleigh, Exmouth Withycombe Urban, Lympstone, Newbridges, Newton Poppleford and Harpford, Raleigh, Seaton, Sidmouth Rural, Sidmouth Town, Sidmouth Woolbrook, Trinity, Upper Axe, Woodbury, and Yarty.

2010–present: The District of East Devon wards of Broadclyst, Budleigh, Clyst Valley, Exmouth Brixington, Exmouth Halsdon, Exmouth Littleham, Exmouth Town, Exmouth Withycombe Raleigh, Newton Poppleford and Harpford, Ottery St Mary Rural, Ottery St Mary Town, Raleigh, Sidmouth Rural, Sidmouth Sidford, Sidmouth Town, Whimple, and Woodbury and Lympstone, and the City of Exeter wards of St Loyes and Topsham.

The constituency is in the county of Devon, including  eastern wards  of Exeter, and has a shoreline on the Jurassic Coast.

Following a review of parliamentary representation in Devon by the Boundary Commission for England, which has increased the number of seats in the county from 11 to 12, East Devon was subject to significant boundary changes at the 2010 general election. In particular, the towns of Axminster and Seaton were transferred to the Tiverton and Honiton constituency. In addition, two wards from the City of Exeter are now part of the East Devon seat.

Constituency profile 
The main settlements in the constituency are the City Of Exeter Ward, St Loyes and neighbouring Topsham , the resorts of Exmouth, Budleigh Salterton and Sidmouth, and the inland towns of Ottery St Mary and Cranbrook
.

Members of Parliament

MPs 1868–1885 
 Constituency created – two seats (1868)

The two-seat constituency of East Devon was abolished at the 1885 general election.

MPs 1997-present 
At the 1997 general election a new constituency of East Devon was established. Sir Peter Emery, MP for Honiton since a 1967 by-election, represented the new East Devon seat until standing down in 2001, when Hugo Swire was elected.

In 2015, 2017 and 2019, the seat saw an unusually strong Independent performance, by the anti-austerity candidate Claire Wright, a Devon county councillor. She won 24% of the vote in 2015, 35.2% in 2017 and 40.4% in 2019, coming second (and significantly ahead of any other candidate) each time.

Elections

Elections in the 2010s 
In 2019, East Devon was one of five English constituencies (the others being Cheltenham, Esher and Walton, Westmorland and Lonsdale and Winchester) where Labour failed to obtain over 5% of the vote, and thus lost its deposit.

Elections in the 2000s

Elections in the 1990s

Elections in the 1880s

 Caused by Walrond's appointment as a Lord Commissioner of the Treasury.

Elections in the 1870s

 

 

 Caused by Courtenay's resignation.

Elections in the 1860s

See also 
 List of parliamentary constituencies in Devon

Notes

References

Sources 
 Boundaries of Parliamentary Constituencies 1885–1972, compiled and edited by F.W.S. Craig (Parliamentary Reference Publications 1972)
 British Parliamentary Election Results 1832–1885, compiled and edited by F.W.S. Craig (Macmillan Press 1977)
 Who's Who of British Members of Parliament: Volume I 1832–1885, edited by M. Stenton (The Harvester Press 1976)
 Who's Who of British Members of Parliament, Volume II 1886–1918, edited by M. Stenton and S. Lees (Harvester Press 1978)

Parliamentary constituencies in Devon
Constituencies of the Parliament of the United Kingdom established in 1868
Constituencies of the Parliament of the United Kingdom disestablished in 1885
Constituencies of the Parliament of the United Kingdom established in 1997